The Rural Municipality of Progress No. 351 is a rural municipality (RM) in the Canadian province of Saskatchewan within Census Division No. 13 and  Division No. 6.

History 
The RM of Progress No. 351 incorporated as a rural municipality on December 12, 1910.

Geography

Communities and localities 
The following urban municipalities are surrounded by the RM.

Towns
 Kerrobert
 Luseland

The following unincorporated communities are within the RM.

Localities
 Onward
 Superb

Demographics 

Attractions 
 Luseland & District Museum

Government 
The RM of Progress No. 351 is governed by an elected municipal council and an appointed administrator that meets on the second Wednesday of every month. The reeve of the RM is Gordon Meyer while its administrator is Kim Adams. The RM's office is located in Luseland.

Transportation 
 Saskatchewan Highway 21
 Saskatchewan Highway 31
 Saskatchewan Highway 51
 Saskatchewan Highway 675
 Saskatchewan Highway 771
 Canadian Pacific Railway
 Luseland Airport

See also 
List of rural municipalities in Saskatchewan

References 

P

Division No. 13, Saskatchewan